Mill scale, often shortened to just scale, is the flaky surface of hot rolled steel, consisting of the mixed iron oxides iron(II) oxide (FeO), iron(III) oxide, and iron(II,III) oxide (magnetite). 

Mill scale is formed on the outer surfaces of plates, sheets or profiles when they are being produced by rolling red hot iron or steel billets in rolling mills. Mill scale is bluish-black in color.

Because it is electrochemically cathodic to steel, any break in the mill scale coating will cause accelerated corrosion of steel exposed at the break. Mill scale is thus a boon for a while until its coating breaks due to handling of the steel product or due to any other mechanical cause. 

Mill scale becomes a nuisance when the steel is to be processed. Any paint applied over it is wasted, since it will come off with the scale as moisture-laden air gets under it. Thus mill scale can be removed from steel surfaces by flame cleaning, pickling, or abrasive blasting, which are all tedious operations that consume energy. This is why shipbuilders and steel fixers used to leave steel and rebar delivered freshly rolled from mills out in the open to allow it to 'weather' until most of the scale fell off due to atmospheric action. Nowadays, most steel mills can supply their product with mill scale removed and steel coated with shop primers over which welding or painting can be done safely.

Mill scale generated in rolling mills will be collected and sent to a sinter plant for recycling.

In art 
Mill scale is sought after by select abstract expressionist artists as its effect on steel can cause unpredicted and seemingly random abstract organic visual effects.  Although the majority of mill scale is removed during its passage through scale breaker rolls during manufacturing, smaller structurally inconsequential residue can be visible. Leveraging this processing vestige by accelerating its corrosive effects through the metallurgical use of phosphoric acid or in conjunction with selenium dioxide can create a high contrast visual substrate onto which other compositional elements can be added.

In refractory production 
Mill scale can be used as a raw material in granular refractory. When this refractory is cast and preheated, these scales provide escape routes for the evaporating water vapor, thus preventing cracks and resulting in a strong, monolithic structure.

In reduced iron powder production
Rolling Mill scale is a complex oxide that contains around 70% iron with traces of nonferrous metals and alkaline compounds. The reduced iron powder may be obtained by converting the mill scale into a single highest oxide i.e. hematite (Fe2O3) and its reduction with hydrogen. Shahid and Choi reported the reverse co-precipitation method for the synthesis of Magnetite from mill scale and used for multiple environmental applications such as nutrient recovery, ballasted coagulation in Activated sludge process, and heavy metal remediation in an aqueous environment.

See also
 Dross
 Firescale
 Hammer paint 
 Slag
 Slag (welding)

References

Metallurgy
Oxides
Steelmaking
Metalworking terminology